Peter Winn (born 1942) is a professor of history at Tufts University specializing in Latin America.  He has written several books, including Americas, which he developed while serving as academic director for the 1993 PBS series of the same name.

Winn earned a BA from Columbia College in 1962 and a PhD from Cambridge University in 1972.

Prof. Peter Winn taught at Princeton University during the 1970s, instructing Sonia Sotomayor, who later became an associate justice of the United States Supreme Court, in four of his classes and serving as her senior thesis advisor.

Published works 

.
.
.

Notes

External links 
Faculty page at Tufts University
Profile from the Tufts Observer

Historians of Latin America
Tufts University faculty
Alumni of the University of Cambridge
Living people
21st-century American historians
21st-century American male writers
Date of birth missing (living people)
Columbia College (New York) alumni
1942 births
American male non-fiction writers